Maulvi Mohammadullah Idris is an Afghan Taliban politician who is currently serving as Governor of Kapisa province since September 2021.

References

Living people
Year of birth missing (living people)
Taliban governors
Governors of Kapisa Province